Jan Cios (born August 22, 1976 in Biłgoraj) is a Polish footballer who plays for Żyrardowianka Żyrardów.

External links 
 

1976 births
Living people
Polish footballers
Odra Wodzisław Śląski players
Arka Gdynia players
Górnik Zabrze players
Bruk-Bet Termalica Nieciecza players
Sandecja Nowy Sącz players
People from Biłgoraj
Sportspeople from Lublin Voivodeship
Association football defenders
Tomasovia Tomaszów Lubelski players